Damodar Chaudhary (d. April 29, 2010, Kathmandu) was a Nepalese politician from Dang Deukhuri District belonging to the Communist Party of Nepal (Marxist–Leninist). He was elected to the Constituent Assembly of Nepal in the 2007 election through the proportional representation vote. In the Constituent Assembly, he sat in the Committee for Determining the Structure of the Legislative Body  and the Development Committee.

References

Year of birth missing
2010 deaths
People from Dang District, Nepal
Nepalese communists
Communist Party of Nepal (Marxist–Leninist) politicians

Members of the 1st Nepalese Constituent Assembly